True Lies is a 1994 American action comedy film written and directed by James Cameron and starring Arnold Schwarzenegger.

True Lies may also refer to:

True Lies franchise
True Lies (TV series), a television series based on the film airing on CBS
True Lies (video game), a 1994 top-view action shooting game based on the film
True Lies: Music From The Motion Picture, a 1994 soundtrack album to the eponymous film True Lies

Other uses
 "True Lies" (The Vampire Diaries), the second episode of the fifth season of the American series The Vampire Diaries
 "True Lies" (song), a 1997 single by Sara Evans
 True Lies (album), by Belgian band Dive released in 1999
 "True Lies" (Black Milk song), a song on the album Fever released in 2018

See also

 
 True (disambiguation)
 Lies (disambiguation)